Joseph J. Kowalski (1911-1967) was a Democratic politician from Michigan who served as Speaker of the Michigan House of Representatives. Involved in labor since 1936, Kowalski was elected to the House in 1948 representing part of Wayne County, and remained in the House

Kowalski entered labor in 1936 as an organizer in Indiana, Ohio and Michigan for the American Federation of State, County and Municipal Employees. He also served on the advisory committee on workers' education to the U. S. Secretary of Labor and in several other labor roles, including international representative of the UAW-CIO.

After a defeat in 1946, Kowalski was elected to the House of Representatives in 1948. He was elected Speaker for the 73rd Legislature, the first Democratic speaker since 1938. During his tenure, the Legislature worked to implement the new state constitution which was adopted in 1964.

Kowalski was an alternate delegate to the Democratic National Convention in both 1960 and 1964.

References

1911 births
1967 deaths
Speakers of the Michigan House of Representatives
Democratic Party members of the Michigan House of Representatives
American trade unionists
People from East Chicago, Indiana
People from Wayne County, Michigan
Valparaiso University alumni
20th-century American politicians
American Federation of State, County and Municipal Employees people